Houston County was an American country music trio formerly signed to Stroudavarious Records. The group is composed of brothers Zack Hooper (lead vocals) and Adam Hooper (bass guitar), as well as John Milldrum (lead guitar). The trio released its debut single "I Can't Make It Rain" in September 2009, and it debuted at No. 58 on the Billboard Hot Country Songs chart dated for the week of October 31, 2009. Karlie Justus of Engine 145 gave the song a thumbs-up, saying that it had "weak opening chords" but that it was "lyrically interesting." The band has also filmed a music video for this song.

Discography

Singles

Music videos

References

Country music groups from Alabama
R&J Records artists